Esakiozephyrus is a genus of butterflies in the family Lycaenidae. Esakiozephyrus species are found in the Western Himalayan broadleaf forests, and in similar habitats in Burma, Tibet and Nepal.

Species
Esakiozephyrus icana (Moore, [1875]) – dull green hairstreak
Esakiozephyrus longicaudatus Huang, 2001
Esakiozephyrus camurius (Murayama, 1986)
Esakiozephyrus vallonia (Oberthür, 1914)
Esakiozephyrus neis (Oberthür, 1914)
Esakiozephyrus tsangkie (Oberthür, 1886)
Esakiozephyrus zotelistes (Oberthür, 1914)

Iwaseozephyrus species group
Esakiozephyrus ackeryi (Fujioka, 1994)
Esakiozephyrus bieti (Oberthür, 1886) – Indian purple hairstreak
Esakiozephyrus mandara (Doherty, 1886)
Esakiozephyrus dohertyi (de Niceville, 1889)
Esakiozephyrus zhengi Huang, 1998

References

 
Theclini
Lycaenidae genera